Rockcliffe St. J. Manley (born 26th March, 1925 - died 31st December 2011) was a Jamaican-Canadian chemist known for his development of the electrospinning technique of producing polymer nanofibres and for his work on cellulose.

Early life 
Manley was born in Kingston, Jamaica. His parents were Harvey Arnold Manley and Vinette Madaline Bingham, and he had 3 brothers and one sister.

Academic Career 
He spent most of his later academic career at McGill University in Canada, in the Pulp and Paper Science Division of the Chemistry Department. 

In 1953 he received his PhD from McGill University on the subject “Rotations, Collisions and Orientations in Model Suspensions” (supervised by Stan Mason), and published early papers on the physics of particle motions.

He made substantial contributions to cellulose research, but he was the first person to publish the electrospining of a polymer melt. Manley electrospun molten polymers, and showed that they (if thin enough) had a shish-kebab structure. Later the technique of electrospinning was carried out by other authors using polymer solutions. Manley's PhD student, Lidia Larrondo, with whom he published the electrospinning work, was a refugee from General Pinochet’s Chile.

He developed a chain folding theory for the structure of cellulose, which was criticised at the time. He based his work on that of the Bristol University physicist Andrew Keller. Keller had come up with a structure for polyethylene that required the polymer chains to fold, in what are now known as lamellae, making up a spherulitic structure. Manley applied the same theories to cellulose, carrying out high resolution electron microscopy. Later it was generally accepted that the crystalline structure of cellulose is not chain folded.

Manley won the Anselme Payen Award from the Cellulose and Renewable Materials Division of the American Chemical Society in 2002.

Honors and awards 

 2002 - Anselme-Payen Award by the American Chemical Society
 1976 - Fellow of the American Physical Society
 Fellow of the Chemical Institute of Canada

Personal Life and Death 
He was married twice, to Ulla-Brita Henriksson, and later to Linda St. Denis. His second cousin once removed was the Prime Minister of Jamaica - Michael Manley. He had three children. Manley died on 31st December 2011 in St. Mary's Hospital (Montreal).

References 

Canadian chemists

1925 births
2011 deaths